Raúl Marcelo Pacífico Scozzina (August 14, 1921 – June 11, 2011) was an Argentine prelate of the Roman Catholic Church.

Raúl Marcelo Pacífico Scozzina was born in San Martín Norte, Argentina and was ordained a priest on December 23, 1944 from the religious order Order of Friars Minor. Scozzina was appointed bishop of the Diocese of Formosa on May 7, 1957 and ordained a bishop on July 21, 1957. Scozzina resigned from the Diocese of Formosa on March 31, 1978.

See also
Order of Friars Minor
Diocese of Formosa

Notes

20th-century Roman Catholic bishops in Argentina
1921 births
2011 deaths
Roman Catholic bishops of Formosa, Argentina